The Autumn darter  is a species of dragonfly endemic to Japan. It lives near grasslands and can grow up to 40 mm in length. After emerging, these dragonflies migrate to high mountains where they feed until descending to breeding pools (often temporary or artificial, including rice fields) at lower levels.

See also
Akatombo—beloved Japanese song about this dragonfly

References

Libellulidae
Insects described in 1883